Varvara Esina (born 20 April 2004 in Nizhny Novgorod) is a Russian professional squash player. As of December 2021, she was ranked number 152 in the world.

References

2004 births
Living people
Sportspeople from Nizhny Novgorod